{{safesubst:#invoke:RfD||2=Queen’s Slipper|month = March
|day =  8
|year = 2023
|time = 22:35
|timestamp = 20230308223553

|content=
REDIRECT Australian Paper
Australian card games
Australian games
Manufacturing companies based in Melbourne
Playing card manufacturers

}}